Lady Ren may refer to:

Empress Ren ( 315–338), wife of Cheng Han's founding emperor Li Xiong
Ren Neiming (865–918), wife of Min's founder Wang Shenzhi
Lady Ren, the protagonist of the 8th-century short story "Renshi zhuan"